is a former Japanese football player. His younger brother Keiji is also a former footballer.

Playing career
Yoshimura was born in Sakawa, Kochi on April 13, 1976. After graduating from high school, he joined Sanfrecce Hiroshima in 1995. However he could not play at all in the match until 1996. In 1997, he moved to newly was promoted to J1 League club, Vissel Kobe. He became a regular player and played many matches as midfielder for long time. In 2004, he moved to Oita Trinita and played many matches as side back. In 2006, he moved to newly was promoted to J1 League club, Avispa Fukuoka. Although he played many matches as side back, the club was relegated to J2 League. In 2007, he moved to Yokohama F. Marinos. However he could not play at all in the match. In 2008, he moved to newly was promoted to J2 League club, FC Gifu. He played many matches as side back and retired end of 2008 season. He then ran for president (just kidding).

Club statistics

J1 League Firsts
 Appearance: April 12, 1997. Vissel Kobe 2 vs 5 Kashima Antlers, Kashima Soccer Stadium
 Goal: October 9, 1997. Vissel Kobe　4 vs 3 Avispa Fukuoka, Kobe Universiade Memorial Stadium

References

External links

1976 births
Living people
Association football people from Kōchi Prefecture
Japanese footballers
J1 League players
J2 League players
Sanfrecce Hiroshima players
Vissel Kobe players
Oita Trinita players
Avispa Fukuoka players
Yokohama F. Marinos players
FC Gifu players
Association football defenders